Ben Broeders (born 21 June 1995) is a Belgian athlete specialising in the pole vault. He won the gold medal at the 2017 European U23 Championships. In addition, he finished fourth at the European Championships

His personal bests in the event are 5.85 metres outdoors (Merzig 2022) and 5.80 metres indoors (Liévin 2020).

International competitions

References

External links
 
 
 

1995 births
Living people
Belgian male pole vaulters
Sportspeople from Leuven
Belgian Athletics Championships winners
Universiade bronze medalists for Belgium
Universiade medalists in athletics (track and field)
Medalists at the 2019 Summer Universiade
Athletes (track and field) at the 2020 Summer Olympics
Olympic athletes of Belgium